The Matilda Awards are awards which recognise excellence in cabaret, dance, theatre, and performance in southeast Queensland.

History 
Established in 1987 by Alison Cotes and Sue Gough, the awards are an annual event held in February or March. The awards are voted by a panel of industry personnel and critics and membership of the panel has changes over time.

In 2012 Silver and Gold Matilda statuettes were introduced, awarded for either a single work or a body of work over time. There were five Gold Awards each year but in 2015 only one was awarded as a result of industry advice.

In 2013 the Award for the Best Emerging Artist was changed to Bille Brown Award for Best Emerging Artist, named after the late actor.

At the 2015 awards co-founder Alison Cotes was farewelled after 25 years on the committee. She later wrote: "In spite of many changes over its 29 year history, and the often bitter political rows about format and judges, the Matilda Awards are still going strong, and with the backing of Arts Queensland will continue to develop, even if they do annoy many people along the way and attract plenty of criticism."

At the 2015 awards the Gold Matilda was awarded posthumously to Carol Burns. She was renowned in Brisbane theatre and the audience responded with a standing ovation.

There has been some criticism by Kate Wilson (actor, director, teacher) that the awards only recognize Brisbane productions, and for the number of categories. Nathalael Cooper wrote in the Brisbane Times that the Matildas give Brisbane performers/craftsmen recognition as the national Helpmann Awards tend to ignore Brisbane productions.

Over the years awards have been won by productions from many theatre companies including Aboriginal Centre for the Performing Arts, Fractal Theatre Company,  Harvest Rain, Judith Wright Arts Centre, La Boite, Grin 'n' Tonic, little red company, Metro Arts, Monsters Appear, Oscar Theatre Company,  Queensland Theatre Company (QTC), shake & stir, The Escapists, Wax Lyrical, and Zen Zen Zo Physical Theatre.

Hall of Fame 
In 2011, the Matilda Awards created a Hall of Fame which recognizes performers/craftsmen for a body of work. Current inductees are Sven Swenson, Sue Rider, Eugene Gilfedder, David Walters, Bill Haycock, Dale Ferguson, Andrew Buchanan, Caroline Kennison, Michael Futcher, Helen Howard, Greg Clarke, Hayden Spencer, Helen Cassidy, and Jennifer Flowers.

Awards 
Winners are listed on the Matilda Awards website.

References 

Australian theatre awards
Awards established in 1987
Culture of Brisbane